John Fitzgibbon or FitzGibbon may refer to:

John FitzGibbon (Irish lawyer) (c.1708–1780), Irish lawyer and politician
John FitzGibbon, 1st Earl of Clare (1748–1802), Attorney-General and Lord Chancellor of Ireland
John FitzGibbon, 2nd Earl of Clare (1792–1851), Privy Councillor and Governor of Bombay
John Fitzgibbon (politician) (1845–1919), United Kingdom Member of Parliament for South Mayo (1910–1918)
John Fitzgibbon (Cork hurler) (born 1967), Irish hurler
John Fitzgibbon (Limerick hurler) (born 1992), Irish hurler

See also 
John Fitzgibbons (1868–1941), U.S. Representative from New York